The 2017 Big Sky Conference women's basketball tournament was a tournament that held from March 6-11, 2017 at the Reno Events Center. Montana State won their 2nd conference tournament title for the first time since 1993 and earns an automatic trip to the 2017 NCAA tournament.

Seeds
Big Sky Tiebreaker procedures are as follows:
Head-to-head
Performance against conference teams in descending order to finish
Higher RPI
Coin Flip

* Overall record at end of regular season.

Schedule

Bracket

See also
 2017 Big Sky Conference men's basketball tournament

References

2016–17 Big Sky Conference women's basketball season
Big Sky Conference women's basketball tournament
Basketball competitions in Reno, Nevada
College basketball tournaments in Nevada
Women's sports in Nevada
College sports tournaments in Nevada